Henry William Stubbington FRCO LRAM ARCM LTCL   (b. 1891) was an organist and composer based in England.

Life

He was born in Upham in Hampshire in 1891, the son of Edward Stubbington and Eliza Jane. He was educated at Durham University.

He was director of music at Handsworth Grammar School from 1935 to He was appointed Professor of Music at the Birmingham School of Music in 1944.

Appointments

Assistant Organist of Winchester Cathedral 1912–1921
Organist of St. Thomas' Parish Church, Newport, Isle of Wight 
Organist of St Martin in the Bull Ring 1942–1947

Compositions

He composed
Ring out, ye crystal spheres. A choral ode for 5 part chorus, soprano solo and orchestra

References

1891 births
English organists
British male organists
English composers
Fellows of the Royal College of Organists
Year of death missing